The Twelfth (also called Orangemen's Day) is an Ulster Protestant celebration held on 12 July. It began in the late 18th century in Ulster. It celebrates the Glorious Revolution (1688) and victory of Protestant King William of Orange over Catholic King James II at the Battle of the Boyne (1690), which ensured a Protestant Ascendancy in Ireland. On and around the Twelfth, large parades are held by the Orange Order and Ulster loyalist marching bands, streets are bedecked with British flags and bunting, and large towering bonfires are lit in loyalist neighbourhoods. Today the Twelfth is mainly celebrated in Northern Ireland, where it is a public holiday, but smaller celebrations are held in other countries where Orange lodges have been set up.

Since its beginning, the Twelfth has often been accompanied by violence between Ulster Protestants and Catholics, especially during times of political tension. Protestant loyalists see the Twelfth as an important part of their culture, while Catholic Irish nationalists see many aspects of it as sectarian, triumphalist and supremacist. Flag-burning on Eleventh Night bonfires, and Orange marches through Catholic neighbourhoods, have been especially controversial. The Drumcree conflict is the most well-known dispute involving Orange marches. Sectarian violence around the Twelfth worsened during the Troubles, but today most events pass off peacefully. Recently there have been attempts to draw tourists to the main Twelfth parades and present them as family-friendly pageants.

When 12 July falls on a Sunday, the parades are held instead on the next Monday, 13 July.

Origins

Orangemen commemorated several events dating from the 17th century onwards, celebrating the continued dominance of Protestantism in Ireland after the Irish Rebellion of 1641 and triumph in the Williamite War in Ireland (1689–91). Early celebrations were 23 October, the anniversary of the 1641 rebellion (an attempted coup d'état by Catholic gentry who tried to seize control of the English administration in Ireland); and 4 November, the birthday of William of Orange, Protestant victor of the Williamite war in the 1690s. Both of these anniversaries faded in popularity by the end of the 18th century.

The Twelfth itself originated as a celebration of the Battle of Aughrim, which took place on 12 July 1691 in the 'Old Style' (O.S.) Julian calendar then in use. Aughrim was the decisive battle of the Williamite war, in which the predominantly Irish Catholic Jacobite army was destroyed and the remainder capitulated at Limerick, whereas the Boyne was less decisive. The Twelfth in the early 18th century was a popular commemoration of Aughrim, featuring bonfires and parades. The Battle of the Boyne (fought on 1 July 1690) was commemorated with smaller parades on 1 July. However, the two events were combined in the late 18th century. The first reason for this was the British switch to the Gregorian calendar in 1752, which repositioned the nominal date of the Battle of the Boyne to 11 July New Style (N.S.) (with the Battle of Aughrim nominally repositioned to 23 July N.S.). The second reason was the foundation of the Orange Order in 1795. The Order preferred the Boyne, due to William of Orange's presence there. It has also been suggested that in the 1790s (a time of Roman Catholic resurgence) the Boyne, where the Jacobites were routed, was more appealing to the Order than Aughrim, where they had fought hard and died in great numbers.

The Order's first marches took place on 12 July 1796 in Portadown, Lurgan and Waringstown. The Twelfth parades of the early 19th century often led to public disorder, so much so that the Orange Order and the Twelfth were banned in the 1830s and 40s (see below).

Events

Lead-up to the Twelfth
In the weeks leading up to the Twelfth, Orange Order and other Ulster loyalist marching bands hold numerous parades in Northern Ireland. The most common of these are lodge parades, in which one Orange lodge marches with one band. Others, such as the "mini-Twelfth" at the start of July, involve several lodges.

From June to August, Protestant, unionist areas of Northern Ireland are bedecked with flags and bunting, which are usually flown from lampposts and houses. The most common flags flown are the Union Jack and Ulster Banner. Kerbstones may be painted red, white and blue and murals may be made. Steel or wooden arches, bedecked with flags and Orange symbolism, are raised over certain streets. These 'Orange arches' are inspired by triumphal arches.

As well as the Union Jack and Ulster Banner, the flags of illegal loyalist paramilitary groups—such as the Ulster Volunteer Force (UVF) and Ulster Defence Association (UDA)—are flown in some areas. The raising of these flags near Catholic/Irish nationalist neighbourhoods, or in "neutral" areas, often leads to tension and sometimes violence. It is seen as deliberately provocative and intimidating.

Eleventh Night

On the night before the Twelfth—the "Eleventh Night"—huge towering bonfires are lit in many working-class Protestant neighbourhoods in Northern Ireland. They are built mostly of wooden pallets and lumber by local young men and boys in the weeks before the Twelfth. Their lighting is often accompanied by a street party and loyalist marching band. Eleventh Night events have been condemned for sectarianism and for damage and pollution caused by the fires. Each year, Irish tricolours are burnt on many bonfires, and in some cases effigies, posters of Irish nationalist figures, and Catholic symbols are also burnt. During the Troubles, loyalist paramilitaries used bonfire events to hold "shows of strength", in which masked gunmen fired volleys into the air. Some are still controlled by paramilitary members, and authorities may be wary of taking action against controversial bonfires. Not all bonfires are controversial however, and there have been attempts to de-politicize bonfire events and make them more family-friendly and environmentally-friendly. Some bonfires are also criticised as being unsafely constructed.

Main events

The main way in which the Twelfth is celebrated is through large parades involving Orangemen and supporting bands. Most of the parades are in Ulster, almost exclusively being held in Northern Ireland and County Donegal, although Orange lodges elsewhere often hold parades as well. The parade usually begins at an Orange Hall, proceeds through the town or city and out to a large park or field where the marchers, their friends and family, and the general public gather to eat, drink and listen to speeches by clergymen, politicians and senior members of the Order. In the past the Twelfth has been a major venue for discussion of political issues. A church service will also be held and sometimes band prizes will be awarded. Within Northern Ireland, each District Lodge usually organises its own parade. In rural districts the parade will rotate around various towns, sometimes favouring those in which there is less likely to be trouble, but in other years choosing those in which it is felt the 'right to march' needs to be defended.

In Northern Ireland, there is a long tradition of Protestant and loyalist marching bands, which can be found in most towns. The Orangemen hire these bands to march with them on the Twelfth. An instrument almost unique to these marches is the Lambeg drum. Popular songs include "The Sash" and "Derry's Walls". Explicitly violent songs such as "Billy Boys" may also be played.

The vast majority of marchers are men, but there are some all-women bands and a few mixed bands. Some all-male bands have female flag or banner carriers. There are also some Women's Orange Lodges which take part in the parades. Orangewomen have paraded on the Twelfth in some rural areas since at least the mid-20th century, but were banned from the Belfast parades until the 1990s.

Orangemen on parade typically wear a dark suit, an Orange sash, white gloves and a bowler hat. Certain Orangemen carry a ceremonial sword. In hot weather, many lodges will parade in short-sleeved shirts. Orangewomen have not developed a standard dress code, but usually dress formally. The supporting bands each have their own uniforms and colours. Both the Orangemen and bands carry elaborate banners depicting Orange heroes, historic or Biblical scenes, and/or political symbols and slogans. The most popular image is that of King William of Orange crossing the River Boyne during the famous battle there.

At the field, some lodges and bands don humorous outfits or accessories and make the return journey in them, and the mood is generally more mellow, although in times of tension it can also be more aggressive.

The Northern Irish and County Donegal parades are given extensive local TV and press coverage, while the BBC Northern Ireland programme The Twelfth is the longest-running outside broadcast programme in Northern Ireland.

One of the largest Orange demonstrations held anywhere each year is the annual parade held at Rossnowlagh, a tiny village near Ballyshannon in the south of County Donegal in the west of Ulster. County Donegal being one of the Ulster counties in the Republic of Ireland, the Rossnowlagh demonstration is the only major Orange event in the Republic. A number of much smaller Orange events take place each year in East Donegal as well.

Controversies and violence
In Northern Ireland, where around half the population is from an Irish Catholic background, the Twelfth is a tense time. Orange marches through Irish Catholic and Irish nationalist neighbourhoods are usually met with opposition from residents, and this sometimes leads to violence. Many people see these marches as sectarian, triumphalist, supremacist, and an assertion of British and Ulster Protestant dominance. The political aspects have caused further tension. Marchers insist that they have the right to celebrate their culture and walk on public streets, particularly along their 'traditional routes'. In a 2011 survey of Orangemen throughout Northern Ireland, 58% of Orangemen said they should be allowed to march through Catholic or Irish nationalist areas with no restrictions; 20% said they should negotiate with residents first. Some have argued that members of both communities once participated in the event; although it has always been a Protestant affair and many Catholics opposed the marches.

Violence has accompanied Twelfth marches since their beginning.

On 12 July 1797, eight Catholic members of the County Kerry Militia died in a clash with Orangemen and local yeomanry in Stewartstown.
On 12 July 1884, a postal worker was shot and killed in a riot at Cleator Moor in West Cumbria.
Clashes broke out between Orange marchers and Irish nationalists in Belfast on 12 July 1813. Several Orangemen opened fire on a crowd in Hercules Street, killing two Protestants and wounding four other people.
 On 12 July 1829, eight people were killed during Orange marches in Enniskillen, seven were killed in Clones and one was killed in Stewartstown. In Maghera, several Catholic homes were burnt down, prompting the intervention of the military. There was also trouble at marches in Armagh, Portadown, Bellaghy, Comber, Greyabbey, Glenoe and Strabane.
 Five Catholics were reportedly shot dead in Rathfriland and three or four were drowned in the river near Katesbridge after Twelfth marches in 1831. The following August, all Twelfth marches were banned by the Party Processions Act 1832. This Act was to be enforced for five years, until August 1837.
 The military used six pieces of artillery to help quell trouble at a Twelfth gathering at Scarva in 1836.
 A gun battle broke out on the Twelfth in 1849, when Orangemen marched through the rural Catholic community of Dolly's Brae near Castlewellan. Orangemen clashed with Catholic Ribbonmen, leaving a number of Ribbonmen and other Catholics dead. This became known as the "Battle of Dolly's Brae". As a result of the clashes, the Party Processions Act was renewed the following year.
 Following the 1857 Twelfth marches in Belfast, sectarian rioting erupted in the city and lasted for ten days.
The Portadown News reported that 16 Catholics were shot by Orangemen in Derrymacash on 12 July 1860. One died of his wounds. Stone-throwing had broken out when the Orangemen tried to march past the Catholic chapel. Outnumbered, some of the Orangemen opened fire on the Catholics and retreated. This led to the passing of the Party Emblems Act in August that year, which forbade the carrying of weapons and the wearing of party colours in procession.
The Orange riots occurred two years in a row during Twelfth marches in New York City. In 1870, eight people died in the clashes. In 1871, over 60 civilians (mostly Irish Catholics) and three Guardsmen lost their lives and over 150 were wounded.
Throughout the summer of 1886, there were a string of riots in Belfast. Violence was particularly fierce during and after the Twelfth. By September, an estimated 31 people had been killed.
In 1935, the Twelfth led to the worst violence in Belfast since the foundation of Northern Ireland in 1922. The violence allegedly began when Orangemen tried to enter the Catholic enclave of Lancaster Street. Nine people were killed and 514 Catholic families, comprising 2,241 people, were forced to flee their homes.

During the Troubles (late 1960s to late 1990s), the Twelfth was often accompanied by riots and paramilitary violence. In 1972, three people were shot dead on the Twelfth in Portadown and two people were killed in Belfast. Of the five in total, two were killed by Republican groups and three were killed by Loyalist groups. On the Twelfth in 1998, during the Drumcree conflict, three young boys were killed when loyalists firebombed their house in Ballymoney. The boys' mother was a Catholic, and their home was in a mainly Protestant housing estate. The killings provoked widespread anger from both Catholics and Protestants.

Since the Troubles began, some bands hired to appear at Twelfth marches have openly shown support for loyalist paramilitary groups, either by carrying paramilitary flags and banners or sporting paramilitary names and emblems. A number of prominent loyalist militants were Orangemen and took part in their marches. In February 1992, the loyalist UDA shot dead five Catholic civilians in a betting shop in Belfast. When Orangemen marched past the shop that 12 July, some marchers held up five fingers in mockery of the five dead. The Secretary of State, Patrick Mayhew, said that they "would have disgraced a tribe of cannibals".

Every Twelfth between 1970 and 2005, British Army soldiers were deployed in Belfast to help police the parades. Due to improved policing, dialogue between marchers and residents, and the Northern Ireland peace process, parades have been generally more peaceful since the 2000s. The Parades Commission was set up in 1998 to deal with contentious parades.

During the Troubles some Irish Catholic and nationalist areas organised festivals to keep their children away from the parades, where they might come into conflict with Protestant children, and to make the Twelfth more enjoyable for their communities.

The Twelfth outside Ulster

Although mostly an Ulster event, the Twelfth is also celebrated in other countries with strong links to Ulster or a history of settlement by Irish Protestants. Outside of Northern Ireland, there are commemorations of the Twelfth in Scotland – particularly in and around Glasgow, where most Irish immigrants settled. In England and Wales, Orange marches aren't common and Orange Order membership is found primarily in the Merseyside region, although numbers are still small. Marches here tend to be held a week or so before the Twelfth, due to the number of bands and lodges who travel to Northern Ireland to march there. The Liverpool lodges parade both in the city and in the seaside resort of Southport on 12 July.

There are also Twelfth marches in Canada and Australia. As the longest consecutively held parade in North America (first held in 1821), the Twelfth March was the largest parade in Toronto when thousands of Orangemen would march in front of tens of thousands of spectators, until the 1970s.  At the time, the Orange Order held such sway that membership in the Order was an unspoken prerequisite for holding civic office. However, the march's popularity has drastically diminished in recent years, as only about 500 people participate in modern Orange parades. Orangemen's Day is still a provincial public sector holiday in the Canadian province of Newfoundland and Labrador, but not a shops closing holiday.

An increase in membership in recent years has seen a revival of the Order in Australia and an annual Twelfth of July parade is currently held in Adelaide. Parades were also formerly held in New Zealand on the Twelfth.

Until the Partition of Ireland in the early 1920s, the Twelfth was celebrated by Protestants in many parts of Ireland. However, the reduction of Protestant political influence in what is now the Republic of Ireland has meant the only remaining major annual parade within the Republic is at Rossnowlagh, County Donegal, in the west of Ulster, which was held on the Twelfth until the 1970s, when it was moved to the weekend before. In the rest of Ireland, outside of the nine-county Province of Ulster, there are no major Orange events.

In July 2010, former Tánaiste Michael McDowell said that the Twelfth should be made a national holiday in the Republic of Ireland as well as in Northern Ireland.

See also 

 Banners in Northern Ireland
 Culture of Ireland
 Orange walk
 Parades in Northern Ireland

Notes

References

External links 

 The Twelfth in pictures BBC News, 12 July 2006
 Gallery Orange Chronicle
 North Belfast parade passes peacefully RTÉ News, 12 July 2006

Culture of Northern Ireland
Festivals in Northern Ireland
July observances
Orange Order
Parades in the United Kingdom
Summer traditions
Annual events in Northern Ireland
Summer events in Northern Ireland
12 (number)